Shunovo is a rural locality (a village) in Rozhdestvenskoye Rural Settlement, Sobinsky District, Vladimir Oblast, Russia. The population was 31 as of 2010. There are 4 streets.

Geography 
Shunovo is located 32 km northwest of Sobinka (the district's administrative centre) by road. Borisovo is the nearest rural locality.

References 

Rural localities in Sobinsky District